Artashes Gabrieli Abeghyan (also Abeghian) ( 1 January 1878, Astabad, Nakhchivan – 13 March 1955, Munich) was an Armenian philologist, historian, educator, activist and politician of the Armenian Revolutionary Federation. He was the nephew of Armenian scholar Manuk Abeghyan, who was behind the Armenian orthography reform in the 1920s. He graduated from Nersisian School. During the period of the First Republic of Armenia (1918-1920), he served as a member of parliament.

From 1926 to 1945, he was professor of Armenian Studies at the University of Berlin, and wrote prolifically in German on Armenology. During World War II, Abeghyan headed the Armenischen Nationalen Gremiums (Armenian National Council) in Berlin, a collaborationist body created by Nazi Germany. He also wrote for the ANG's newspaper titled Azat Hayastan ("Free Armenia"). His home was destroyed by the Allied bombing of Berlin, after which he fled to Stuttgart. He settled in Munich in 1947, where he taught Armenian Studies at the University of Munich until his death in 1955.

Works 
 Vorfragen zur Entstehungsgeschichte der Altarmenischen Bibelübersetzungen
 Geschichte Armeniens; ein Abriss
 Ughghagrakan baṛagrkʻoyk
 Pawghikeankʻ Biwzandakan kasrutʻean mēj ew merdzawor hertsuatsayin erewoytʻner Hayastani mēj
 Kʻerovbē Patkanean Dorpatum
 Hay mijnadarean aṛakner
 Dorpati hay usanoghutʻiwně
 Das armenische Volksepos
 Armenien 1940 (neunzehnhundertvierzig)

References 

 http://www.worldcat.org/identities/lccn-n99-56856/

1878 births
1955 deaths
Armenian philologists
20th-century Armenian historians
Armenian educators
Armenian activists
Armenian politicians
Nersisian School alumni
Soviet emigrants to Germany